Trigonognatha is a genus of beetles in the family Carabidae, containing the following species:

 Trigonognatha andrewesi Jedlicka, 1932
 Trigonognatha asperipennis Habu, 1978
 Trigonognatha aurescens Bates, 1883
 Trigonognatha becvari Sciaky, 1995
 Trigonognatha birmanica Lassalle, 2010
 Trigonognatha brancuccii Sciaky, 1995
 Trigonognatha cavazzutii Casale & Sciaky, 1994
 Trigonognatha cordicollis Sciaky & Wrase, 1997
 Trigonognatha coreanus (Tschitscherine, 1895)
 Trigonognatha cuprescens Motschulsky, 1858
 Trigonognatha delavayi (Fairmaire, 1888)
 Trigonognatha echarouxi Lassalle, 2010
 Trigonognatha eous (Tschitscherine, 1894)
 Trigonognatha fairmairei Sciaky, 1995
 Trigonognatha formosanus Jedlicka, 1940
 Trigonognatha hauseri Jedlicka, 1933
 Trigonognatha hubeica Facchini & Sciaky, 2003
 Trigonognatha jaechi Sciaky, 1995
 Trigonognatha kutsherai Sciaky & Wrase, 1997
 Trigonognatha latibasis Sciaky & Wrase, 1997
 Trigonognatha princeps Bates, 1883
 Trigonognatha robustus (Fairmaire, 1894)
 Trigonognatha saueri Sciaky, 1995
 Trigonognatha schuetzei Sciaky & Wrase, 1997
 Trigonognatha smetanai Sciaky, 1995
 Trigonognatha straneoi Sciaky & Wrase, 1997
 Trigonognatha uenoi Habu, 1978
 Trigonognatha vignai Casale & Sciaky, 1994
 Trigonognatha viridis Tschitscherine, 1898
 Trigonognatha xichangensis Lassalle, 2010
 Trigonognatha yunnanus Straneo, 1943

References

Pterostichinae